Hermann Askan Demme (* 28 August 1802 in Altenburg; † 18 January 1867 in Bern) was a German-Swiss physician.

Demme was the son of Hermann Gottfried, Generalsuperintendent of Sachsen-Altenburg. At first, he studied philosophy and theology in Jena and Berlin. 1822 he entered the Jenaischen Burschenschaft.  He finished his studies 1830 and became assistant to Johann Lukas Schönlein. 1831 he was a military doctor in Warschau, 1832 he visited the United States of America.

In 1833, Demme married Marie Lucie Elisabeth Auguste Diruf (1808-1882) from Heidelberg. They had one daughter and three sons. In the same year, he became professor for anatomy at the University of Zurich and 1834 he became professor at the University of Bern. 
1847 he  was the first in the German-speaking world to perform surgery using ether for anesthesia.

Works 
 Allgemeine Chirurgie der Schusswunden. Nach eigenen Erfahrungen in den norditalienischen Lazarethen von 1859 und mit Benutzung der bisherigen Leistungen, Bd. 1 von Militärchirurgische Studien, Würzburg 1863. online
 Beiträge zur pathologischen Anatomie des Tetanus und einiger anderen Krankheiten des Nervensystems, Leipzig und Heidelberg 1859. online
 Über die Veränderungen der Gewebe durch Brand. Ein Beitrag zur Pathologischen Histologie, Frankfurt a. M. 1857. online

Sources 
 Marie Lucie Elisabeth Auguste Demme-Diruf: Eine Erfahrung aus meinem Leben und zugleich ein Leitweg zu meiner Menschenkenntniss, s.l., ca. 1866 (Universitätsarchiv Bern).

Literature 
 Helge Dvorak: Biografisches Lexikon der Deutschen Burschenschaft. Band I Politiker, Teilband 1: A-E. Heidelberg 1996, S. 190–191.
 Rahel Hert: Hermann Askan Demme (1802-1867). Der erste Chirurgieprofessor der Universität Bern. Leben und Werk, Bern 2011 (Diss.).
 
 Hermann Rennefahrt, E. Hintzsche, 600 Jahre Inselspital, Bern 1954.
 Sammlung Bernischer Biographien, Bd. 3 (1898), S. 481–518.

References 

19th-century Swiss physicians
Academic staff of the University of Bern
Scientists from Bern
1802 births
1867 deaths